is a passenger railway station located in the city of Miyoshi, Tokushima Prefecture, Japan. It is operated by JR Shikoku and has the station number "D24".

Lines

Layout
The station, which is unstaffed, consists of a side platform serving a single tracks on a hillside. A flight of steps leads up to the platform from the access road. There is no station building but a log-style building at the base of the steps serves as a waiting room. A shelter is provided on the platform.

History
At this time the station was operated by Japanese Government Railways, later becoming Japanese National Railways (JNR). With the privatization of JNR on 1 April 1987, control of the station passed to JR Shikoku.

Surrounding area
Matsuogawa Onsen

See also
List of railway stations in Japan

References

External links

 JR Shikoku timetable

Railway stations in Tokushima Prefecture
Railway stations in Japan opened in 1935
Miyoshi, Tokushima